FC Chertanovo Moscow is a Russian professional football club based in Chertanovo, Moscow who play in the FNL 2, the third tier of Russian football. It is the senior team of the Chertanovo Football Academy.

History
They played professionally from 1993 to 1997 before dropping into the amateur leagues and then returning to the professional leagues, the Russian Professional Football League (3rd tier) in the 2014–15 season. The club won the West zone of the PFL in the 2017–18 season and was promoted to the second-tier Russian Football National League for the first time in their history ahead of the 2018–19 season.

In 2019–20, during their second season in the second division, the campaign was cut short by the COVID-19 pandemic, with the final table showing them in third place, one spot and one point below the promotion zone with more than 10 matches left to play.

Before the 2020–21 season, Chertanovo's head coach Igor Osinkin and 8 leading players transferred to PFC Krylia Sovetov Samara. As a consequence, Chertanovo finished second from the bottom in the season and was relegated back to PFL. Meanwhile, Krylia Sovetov won the FNL season and were promoted back to Russian Premier League and also reached the final of the 2020–21 Russian Cup.

Team name history
 1993: FC SUO Moscow
 1994–present: FC Chertanovo Moscow

Current squad
As of 21 February 2023, according to the Second League website.

Reserve team

External links
  Official site
  Team history at Footballfacts
 FC Chertanovo in Soccerway

 
Association football clubs established in 1993
Football clubs in Moscow
1993 establishments in Russia